Lampione Lighthouse is an active lighthouse located 
on the western tip of the island of Lampione which makes part of the Pelagie Islands in the Channel of Sicily.

Description
The lighthouse is completely automated, Tacconi was the last keeper, powered by a solar unit and managed by the Marina Militare with the identification code number 3064 E.F.

See also
 List of lighthouses in Italy
 Pelagie Islands

References

External links

 Servizio Fari Marina Militare

Lighthouses in Italy
Buildings and structures in Sicily